Carolesia is a genus of small to medium-sized sea snails, marine gastropod molluscs in the family Tegulidae.

Species
 Carolesia blakei (Clench & Aguayo, 1938)

References

 Güller M. & Zelaya D.G. (2014). A new generic placement for "Calliostoma" blakei Clench & Aguayo, 1938 (Gastropoda: Trochoidea). Malacologia. 57(2): 309–317.

Tegulidae
Gastropod genera